Lovett may refer to:

Places
 Lovett, Georgia, USA, an unincorporated community in Laurens County
 Lovett, Indiana, USA, an unincorporated town
 Lovett Township, Jennings County, Indiana
 Lovett Bay, New South Wales, Australia
 Lovett Island, a river island in Tennessee
 Lovett Lake, Nova Scotia, Canada
 Lovett River, Alberta, Canada

Other uses
 Lovett (surname)
 Lovett Purnell (born 1972), National Football League player
 The Lovett School, an independent school in Atlanta, Georgia, USA
 Lovett Tower, Canberra, Australia
 Lovett Baronets, an extinct title in the Baronetage of Great Britain

See also 
Lovat (disambiguation)
Levett
Leavitt